Ghost is the second release by the Australian band In Fiction.

Track listing

Charts

References

2007 EPs
In Fiction albums